The Benedetta class is a series of eight container ships built for E.R. Schiffahrt by Hyundai Heavy Industries in South Korea. All eight ships are currently chartered to Mediterranean Shipping Company (MSC). The ships have a maximum theoretical capacity of around 13,100 twenty-foot equivalent units (TEU).

List of ships

References 

Container ship classes
Ships built by Hyundai Heavy Industries Group